Rivarolo Canavese is a comune (municipality) in the Metropolitan City of Turin in the Italian region of Piedmont, located about  north of Turin.

Main sights

Castle of Malgrà (14th century), built by the counts of San Martino who at the time ruled the Canavese.
San Michele Arcangelo: this church was built in 1759 using a design by Bernardo Antonio Vittone. It has an octagonal dome decorated with stucco.
Church and convent of San Francesco. It houses a fresco of the Adoration of the Child by Giovanni Martino Spanzotti

Twin towns
 Sunchales, Argentina, since 2000

References

External links
 Official website

Canavese